The Wrong Move ( – "False Movement") is a 1975 German road movie directed by Wim Wenders. This was the second part of Wenders' "Road Movie trilogy" which included Alice in the Cities (1974) and Kings of the Road (1976).

With long carefully composed shots characteristic of Wenders' work, the story follows the wanderings of an aspiring young writer, Wilhelm Meister, as he explores his native country, encounters its people and starts defining his vocation. His thoughts are occasionally presented in voice-over. The work is a rough adaption of Johann Wolfgang von Goethe's 1795-96 novel Wilhelm Meister's Apprenticeship, an early example of the Bildungsroman or novel of initiation.

Plot
Aiming to be a writer, Wilhelm leaves his mother and girlfriend in his home town of Glückstadt in the flat far north of Germany and sets out for Bonn. Changing trains at Hamburg, he notices a beautiful actress, Therese, and obtains her phone number. In his compartment are an older man, Laertes, who sometimes communicates by playing a harmonica, and a young female acrobat called Mignon, who appears to be mute. The pair have no money, so Wilhelm pays their fare and puts them up in his cheap hotel, where Therese joins them. Bernhard, an awkward Austrian who wants to be a poet, befriends the four. He says he has a rich uncle with a castle on a peak overlooking the Rhine, but when the five turn up it is the wrong place. Despite their error the owner welcomes them, because their arrival prevented him shooting himself; he says they can stay as long as they like.

However, tensions grow, for Wilhelm is not giving Therese the affection she wants, while Mignon signals her availability to him. Laertes, feeling guilt but not repentant, disgusts Wilhelm by revealing his role in the Holocaust. The owner of the castle then hangs himself, upon which the five leave hastily. Bernhard goes off alone, while Therese takes the other three to her small flat in Frankfurt, where the tensions grow worse. Leaving on his own, Wilhelm completes his symbolic journey by reaching one of the most southerly, highest and emptiest points in Germany, the summit of the Zugspitze.

Cast

Production

Development

According to Wenders, although Wrong Move is based on Wilhelm Meister's Apprenticeship, screenwriter Peter Handke did not use any of the book’s dialogue and incorporated a minimal amount of its action, mainly borrowing its concept of a young man "on a journey of self-realization". Wenders also toyed with the idea of whether such a journey would be a mistake, and hence Handke and Wenders made the film as a refutation of Goethe's novel and German Romanticism, in which their character suffers because of his travels. Wenders also said that Wrong Move is about how to be able to grasp the world through language.

Following The Goalkeeper's Fear of the Penalty (1972), Wrong Move was Wenders' second film collaboration with his friend Handke, who was already a respected author. Handke wrote the screenplay two years after his mother had killed herself, which had deeply affected him and influenced the story's dark tone.

Filming

The film was shot over four weeks, including from a helicopter over the Elbe River. Landscape shots in the film were inspired by the 18th-century paintings of German artist Caspar David Friedrich.

The film marks the debut of Nastassja Kinski, whom Wenders' wife discovered in a disco in Munich. She appeared topless in Wrong Move, and was 12 years old at the time of filming. Later she played one of the leading roles in Wenders' film Paris, Texas (1984), as well as appearing in his Faraway, So Close (1993).

Release
On its international release, the title Falsche Bewegung proved challenging to render in English. The literal meaning is "False Movement", but in the United Kingdom it was released as The Wrong Move, while in the United States, it was titled The Wrong Movement.

In 2016, The Criterion Collection released the film as Wrong Move on DVD and Blu-ray in Region 1. It was included with Alice in the Cities and Kings of the Road in the boxset Wim Wenders: The Road Trilogy.

Reception

Critical reception

In 2008, Chris Petit of The Guardian said initial reaction to Wrong Move was that "it felt talky and clotted, but now looks among the best of the work and much more considered than the popular Wings of Desire (1987)". Critic Richard Brody writes in The New Yorker that Wrong Move is one of Wenders' best films, calling it a virtual documentary of West German sights and moods. Dave Kehr, writing for the Chicago Reader, states that "it's Wenders's most dour film, and the grim tone takes its toll. There is, though, a solid and disturbing talent at work here". Jonathan Romney calls it "a film dense with philosophizing and speechifying, and the most thoroughly literary of all Wenders's films". TV Guide states that Wrong Move is "engaging" because of Wenders' direction, in spite of its emotional distance and unsympathetic characters.

However, Time Out wrote that Wrong Move was unusual for Wenders' filmography, finding fault in Handke's screenplay. Evaluating how it fitted into the "Road Movie trilogy", The A.V. Club asserts "it's unlikely that anyone saw Wenders' next film, Wrong Move, as any sort of sequel to Alice, spiritual or otherwise". The A.V. Club goes on to suggest that in being "far uglier and more depressive than the trilogy’s bookends", it "perhaps serves as a necessary corrective to the other two films, suggesting as it does that there's no escaping one's own inner nature".

Accolades
Wrong Move competed for the Gold Hugo at the 1975 Chicago International Film Festival. It also won several honours at the German Film Awards, marking the first of two times Peter Kern won an acting award at the ceremony.

References

External links 
 
 
 Wrong Move: Utter Detachment, Utter Truth an essay by James Robison at the Criterion Collection

1975 films
1970s drama road movies
German drama road movies
West German films
Films based on works by Johann Wolfgang von Goethe
Films directed by Wim Wenders

Films with screenplays by Peter Handke
Films scored by Jürgen Knieper
Films about suicide
Works based on Wilhelm Meister's Apprenticeship
1970s German-language films
1970s German films